William Mansfield may refer to:

William Mansfield, 1st Baron Sandhurst (1819–1876), British military commander, Commander-in-Chief of India, 1865–1870
William Mansfield, 1st Viscount Sandhurst (1855–1921), his son, British statesman
William Mansfield (Labour MP), British Labour politician, MP for Cleveland, 1929–1931
Billy Mansfield (William Mansfield Jr., born 1956), American serial killer, child molester and sex offender
William Mansfield, suspect of the Villisca axe murders